"After the Gold Rush" is a song written and performed by Neil Young and is the title song from his 1970 album of the same name. In addition to After the Gold Rush, it also appears on the compilation albums Decade, and Greatest Hits, and on Live Rust.

An a capella version of the song was a hit in many countries in 1974 for the English vocal group Prelude.

It is ranked number 322 on Rolling Stone'''s list of The 500 Greatest Songs of All Time.

Composition
Young has said that he doesn't recall what the song is about. Dolly Parton, recalling a conversation while in the process of recording a cover of the song, along with Emmylou Harris and Linda Ronstadt, for their 1999 album Trio II, said:

However, in his 2012 biography Young reportedly gave a different explanation of the song's origin and meaning, describing the inspiration provided by a screenplay of the same name (never produced), which apocalyptically described the last days of California in a catastrophic flood. The screenplay and song's title referred to what happened in California, a place that took shape due to the Gold Rush. Young eventually concluded that:

"After the Gold Rush" consists of three verses which move forward in time from the past (a medieval celebration), to the present (the singer lying in a burned out basement), and, finally, to the end of humanity's time on Earth (the ascension process in which the "chosen ones" are evacuated from Earth in silver spaceships). On the original recording, in addition to Young's vocals, two instruments are utilized: a piano and a flugelhorn. In the decades since the song was first released, the flugelhorn solo in the song has typically been replaced by a harmonica solo by Young in live performances. 

The line "Look at Mother Nature on the run / In the 1970s" has been amended by Young in concert over the decades and is currently sung as "Look at Mother Nature on the run / in the 21st century."

Cover versions
The song has been covered numerous times:

 Perhaps best known is the 1974 interpretation by the group Prelude, whose a capella version was a top 40 hit in numerous countries, especially the United Kingdom where it re-charted in the Top 40 in 1982. The song also peaked in Australia at number 51 in 1974, and the re-recording at 98 in 1982. In the US, it went to number 22 on the Hot 100.
 The country music trio of Dolly Parton, Emmylou Harris, and Linda Ronstadt covered the song on the 1999 album Trio II with two changes to the lyrics: The line "Look at Mother Nature on the run / In the 1970s" became "Look at Mother Nature on the run / in the 20th century", and the line "There was a band playin' in my head / And I felt like getting high" was changed to "There was a band playin' in my head / And I felt like I could cry." Parton performed the song during the 2019 Grammys with Maren Morris and Miley Cyrus. The Trio'' version of the song was also released as a single, and while it received modest radio airplay, a video accompanying the song was very popular on a number of cable video outlets, including CMT, and the song received the Grammy Award for Best Country Collaboration with Vocals in 2000.

References

Neil Young songs
1970 songs
Environmental songs
Songs about outer space
Songs about dreams
Songs written by Neil Young
Song recordings produced by David Briggs (record producer)
Song recordings produced by Neil Young